"Gravity" is a song recorded by Swedish singer Jasmine Kara. The song was released as a digital download in Sweden on 26 February 2017 and peaked at number 57 on the Swedish Singles Chart. It took part in Melodifestivalen 2017, and placed sixth in the third semi-final on 18 February 2017. It was written by Kara and Anderz Wrethov.

Track listing

Chart performance

Weekly charts

Release history

References

2017 singles
2016 songs
English-language Swedish songs
Melodifestivalen songs of 2017
Warner Music Group singles
Swedish pop songs
Songs written by Wrethov